Elena Chistilina is a Paralympic athlete from Russia competing mainly in category T46 sprint events.

She competed in the 2004 Summer Paralympics in Athens, Greece.  There she won a bronze medal in the women's 100 metres - T46 event, a bronze medal in the women's 200 metres - T46 event and finished eighth in the women's 400 metres - T46 event.  She also competed at the 2008 Summer Paralympics in Beijing, China.    There she won a silver medal in the women's 100 metres - T46 event and finished fifth in the women's 200 metres - T46 event

External links
 

Paralympic athletes of Russia
Athletes (track and field) at the 2004 Summer Paralympics
Athletes (track and field) at the 2008 Summer Paralympics
Paralympic silver medalists for Russia
Paralympic bronze medalists for Russia
Year of birth missing (living people)
Living people
Medalists at the 2004 Summer Paralympics
Medalists at the 2008 Summer Paralympics
Paralympic medalists in athletics (track and field)
Russian female sprinters
Sprinters with limb difference
Paralympic sprinters
20th-century Russian women
21st-century Russian women